Marcin Kołodyński (17 April 1980 – 1 February 2001) was a Polish actor and TV presenter.

Education 
He graduated from the Miguel de Cervantes Liceum in Warsaw. He studied journalism at the University of Warsaw.

Death 
He died tragically in the vicinity of Zakopane, while snowboarding. While riding down a dimly lit slope at night, he hit a snow groomer and died at the scene. He was buried at the Northern Communal Cemetery in Warsaw (section S-V-15, row 10, site 3).

Filmography 
Feature films
 1997: Sara
 1999: Ajlawju – student
 2000: Boys Don't Cry – Serfer

TV series
 1999: Na dobre i na złe – Tomek's friend
 1999–2001: Rodzina zastępcza – Darek Kwieciński, Majka Kwiatkowska's boyfriend
 2001: M jak miłość – Paweł Zduński's friend

TV performances
 1995: Chłopcy z placu broni – Czonakosz
 1997: Szara róża – Krzysztof
 1998: Usta Micka Jaggera  – Bartek
 2000: Siedemnastolatek

References

External links
 

1980 births
2001 deaths
20th-century Polish male actors
21st-century Polish male actors
Polish male film actors
Polish male stage actors